Norway is an unincorporated community in Thomas County, Nebraska, United States.

History
Norway was established in the 1880s when the Chicago, Burlington and Quincy Railroad was extended to that point. A large share of the early settlers being natives of Norway likely caused the name to be selected. The first post office in Norway opened in 1887, and operated until 1935.

References

Unincorporated communities in Thomas County, Nebraska
Unincorporated communities in Nebraska